Raz Gal-Or is an Israeli internet businessperson in China.

Gal-Or, the son of Amir Gal-Or, originated from a community near Tel Aviv, and moved to Hong Kong at age 13; at the time Gal-Or lacked fluency in English, and he also lacked fluency in any variety of Chinese. Frank Tang of the South China Morning Post wrote that "his China journey was driven by the ambitions of his father". He attended the Canadian International School of Hong Kong.

He is an alumnus of Peking University, where he studied international relations. He first gained media exposure in China when he got a single appearance on television.

Tang stated that by 2017 Gal-Or was embedded in a Chinese lifestyle and that his Mandarin was "fluent". In July 2021, BBC News reported that Gal-Or was working as a stringer for China Global Television Network.

Foreigner Research Institute China
It is headquartered in Zhongguancun, Haidian District, Beijing.

The name is a pun as "crooked nut" sounds similar to that to the word "foreigner". The organization had been established in 2016 by Gal-Or and his Chinese co-founder Fang Yedun (方晔顿), who Gal-Or met in university and originated from Zhejiang. The series, which as of October 2017 had fifty episodes, has accounts on Bilibili, Sina Weibo, and Youku. Several of Gal-Or's social media profiles are under the name Ychina (meaning "why China?"). Infinity Group, owned by Amir Gal-Or, and Will Hunting Capital had given Gal-Or's production company a 10 million yuan ($1.51 million U.S.) investment. By October 2017 the series, which began in December 2016, had over five million subscribers in its social media platforms. About 70% of the viewers, as of 2017, were female. The initial video, by that month, had over four million views. Tang stated in 2017 that multiple advertisers began using the series.

Coco Liu of the South China Morning Post wrote that FRI "helped to grow the online profiles of many expatriates." Tang wrote that the series "propelled [Gal-Or] to nationwide fame". Charles Liu, a senior blogger of The Beijinger, characterized some of the videos produced by the FRI as "predictable responses expected of foreignness, which in turn is predictably well-received by the Chinese public."

See also
 Afu Thomas (Thomas Derksen) - German social media figure in China
 Lee and Oli Barrett - British social media figures in China
 Dashan - Canadian television personality in China
 David Gulasi - Australian internet celebrity active in China
 Amy Lyons - Australian social media figure in China
 Winston Sterzel - South African social media figure in China

References

Further reading
 
 
 Media

External links
 歪果仁研究协会 Ychina on YouTube
 Foreigner Research Institute on Sina Weibo 

Living people
Israeli expatriates in China
Israeli Internet celebrities
Peking University alumni
1994 births